Gampsocleis is a genus of bush crickets in the subfamily Tettigoniinae and tribe Gampsocleidini.

Distribution and biology 
Species can be found in many parts of mainland Europe (but not the British Isles or Scandinavia), through central Asia to Korea and Japan.  The type species, G. glabra, strongly resembles a smaller version of the wart-biter and this is reflected in common names given to the insect (e.g. dectique des brandes in French and kleine wrattenbijter in Dutch).  As with many Orthoptera, species can be identified with song patterns.

Species 

The Orthoptera Species File lists:
Gampsocleis abbreviata Herman, 1874
Gampsocleis acutipennis Karabag, 1956
Gampsocleis akbari Panhwar, Sultana & Wagan, 2017
Gampsocleis assoi Bolívar, 1900
Gampsocleis beybienkoi Cejchan, 1968
Gampsocleis buergeri Haan, 1842
Gampsocleis carinata Bey-Bienko, 1951
Gampsocleis glabra Herbst, 1786 - type species (as Locusta glabra Herbst)
Gampsocleis gratiosa Brunner von Wattenwyl, 1862
Gampsocleis infuscata Uvarov, 1924
Gampsocleis mongolica Dirsh, 1927
Gampsocleis recticauda Werner, 1901
Gampsocleis ryukyuensis Yamasaki, 1982
Gampsocleis schelkovnikovae Adelung, 1916
Gampsocleis sedakovii Fischer von Waldheim, 1846
Gampsocleis sinensis Walker, 1869
Gampsocleis ussuriensis Adelung, 1910

References

External links 

Orthoptera of Asia
Orthoptera of Europe
Ensifera genera
Tettigoniinae